Events from the year 1698 in the Kingdom of Scotland.

Incumbents 
 Monarch – William II
 Secretary of State – John Murray, Earl of Tullibardine (until 31 March 1698), jointly with James Ogilvy, 1st Earl of Seafield

Law officers 
 Lord Advocate – Sir James Stewart
 Solicitor General for Scotland – Sir Patrick Hume

Judiciary 
 Lord President of the Court of Session – vacant?? until 17 March, then Lord North Berwick 
 Lord Justice General – Lord Lothian
 Lord Justice Clerk – Lord Ormiston

Events 
 Famine in the Borders leads to continued Scottish Presbyterian migration from Scotland to Ulster.
 14 July – first expedition sets sail as part of the Darien scheme.
 November – colony of New Caledonia established on the Isthmus of Panama.

Births 
 February – Colin Maclaurin, mathematician (died 1746)
 11 July – George Turnbull, philosopher, theologian, teacher and writer (died 1748)
date unknown
 Alasdair mac Mhaighstir Alasdair, Gaelic poet (died 1770)
 Charles Douglas, 3rd Duke of Queensberry, landowner, Privy Counsellor and Vice Admiral of Scotland (died 1778)
 John Gow, pirate (executed in London 1725)

Deaths 
 John Leslie, 10th Earl of Rothes, Army officer (died 1767)

See also 
 Timeline of Scottish history

References 

 
Years of the 17th century in Scotland
1690s in Scotland